Justice Palmer may refer to:

Cornelius S. Palmer, associate justice of the South Dakota Supreme Court
George Palmer (composer) (born 1947), associate justice of the Supreme Court of New South Wales
John S. Palmore (1917–2017), associate justice of the Kentucky Supreme Court
Martin Parmer (born Martin Palmer, 1778–1850), chief justice of Jasper County, Texas under the Republic of Texas
Richard N. Palmer (born 1950), associate justice of the Connecticut Supreme Court
William A. Palmer (1781–1860), associate justice of the Vermont Supreme Court